is a former international table tennis player from Japan.

He won a bronze medal at the 1956 World Table Tennis Championships in the mixed doubles with Yoshiko Tanaka.

See also
 List of table tennis players
 List of World Table Tennis Championships medalists

References

Japanese male table tennis players
World Table Tennis Championships medalists